This is a list of people associated with the  School for Creative and Performing Arts (SCPA), a magnet arts school in Cincinnati, Ohio and part of the Cincinnati Public Schools. It includes all notable alumni who attended and all of the principals and artistic directors since the founding of the school.

Alumni

Principals

Artistic directors

References 

Elementary schools in Hamilton County, Ohio
Cincinnati Public Schools
Art schools in Ohio
High schools in Hamilton County, Ohio
Schools of the performing arts in the United States